Leesburg is a town in Plain Township, Kosciusko County, in the U.S. state of Indiana. The population was 555 at the 2010 census.  The town of Leesburg was laid out in 1833 by Levi Lee. It includes the Leesburg Historic District.

Etymology
Leesburg, named for Levi Lee, was established in August 1833. The post office at Leesburg has been in operation since 1839.

The Leesburg Historic District was listed on the National Register of Historic Places in 1993.

History
Leesburg is the oldest town in Kosciusko County. It was the county seat until November 1854, when the Pennsylvania Railroad reached Warsaw. It was home to the first judicial courthouse in the county.

Geography
Leesburg is located at  (41.330538, -85.850323).

Demographics

2010 census
As of the census of 2010, there were 555 people, 214 households, and 152 families living in the town. The racial makeup of the town was 91.7% White, 0.2% African American, 0.2% Native American, 2.3% Asian, 4.3% from other races, and 1.3% from two or more races. Hispanic or Latino of any race were 7.7% of the population.

There were 214 households, of which 37.4% had children under the age of 18 living with them, 57.5% were married couples living together, 6.5% had a female householder with no husband present, 7.0% had a male householder with no wife present, and 29.0% were non-families. 24.8% of all households were made up of individuals, and 8.4% had someone living alone who was 65 years of age or older. The average household size was 2.59 and the average family size was 3.04.

The median age in the town was 38.3 years. 26.7% of residents were under the age of 18; 5.6% were between the ages of 18 and 24; 27.9% were from 25 to 44; 24.6% were from 45 to 64; and 15% were 65 years of age or older. The gender makeup of the town was 49.2% male and 50.8% female.

2000 census
As of the census of 2000, there were 625 people, 232 households, and 176 families living in the town. The racial makeup of the town was 90.40% White, 0.32% African American, 0.48% Native American, 3.04% Asian, 4.16% from other races, and 1.60% from two or more races. Hispanic or Latino of any race were 7.52% of the population.

There were 232 households, out of which 37.1% had children under the age of 18 living with them, 67.2% were married couples living together, 4.7% had a female householder with no husband present, and 24.1% were non-families. 20.7% of all households were made up of individuals, and 7.8% had someone living alone who was 65 years of age or older. The average household size was 2.69 and the average family size was 3.10.

In the town, the population was spread out, with 26.4% under the age of 18, 6.7% from 18 to 24, 33.1% from 25 to 44, 23.8% from 45 to 64, and 9.9% who were 65 years of age or older. The median age was 35 years. For every 100 females, there were 101.0 males. For every 100 females age 18 and over, there were 103.5 males.

The median income for a household in the town was $46,750, and the median income for a family was $49,091. Males had a median income of $32,656 versus $23,438 for females. The per capita income for the town was $20,031. About 2.3% of families and 5.2% of the population were below the poverty line, including 2.6% of those under age 18 and 6.3% of those age 65 or over.

References

Towns in Kosciusko County, Indiana
Towns in Indiana